Poecilopeplus corallifer is a species of beetle in the family Cerambycidae. It was described by Stum in 1826.

References

Trachyderini
Beetles described in 1826